Motile sperm domain containing 2 is a protein that in humans is encoded by the MOSPD2 gene. It is an endoplasmic reticulum–resident protein involved in membrane contact site formation. Its domain homologous to Major Sperm Protein (MSP domain) is very similar to VAPA/VAPB, so it has been described as the third human member of the VAP protein family.

References

Further reading

External links 
 PDBe-KB provides an overview of all the structure information available in the PDB for Mouse Motile sperm domain-containing protein 2